John Farr Abbott, sometimes Abbot (1756 – 22 September 1794) was a British barrister. He was a member of Lincoln's Inn, and became a Fellow of the Society of Antiquaries of London and a Fellow of the Royal Society. He also served as Clerk of Rules in the Court of King's Bench. He died in York and is buried in York Minster.

See also
 Florence Baron

References

External links 
Fellows of the Royal Society
Minister Burial Records

Place of birth missing
1756 births
1794 deaths
18th-century Welsh lawyers
Welsh barristers
Fellows of the Royal Society
Fellows of the Society of Antiquaries of London
Burials at York Minster